is a Japanese rock band based in Machida, Tokyo.

History
They have performed opening and ending theme songs for various anime series such as Ouran High School Host Club, RD Sennō Chōsashitsu, and Hajime No Ippo: New Challenger. To date, they have released six albums, a mini-album, and eight singles.

Members
  - vocals, rhythm guitar
  - vocals, bass
  - lead guitar, screaming, backing vocals
  - drums, backing vocals

Discography

Albums

Tears Library

Tears Library (stylized TEARS LIBRARY) is Last Alliance's first studio album released on July 19, 2003.

Track listing
Boys Don't Cry - 3:57
Run into the Freedom - 3:39
 - 3:59
Last Alliance - 1:51
Rebel Fire - 2:22
Beautiful - 0:48
 - 3:10
See You Again - 2:54
Sky Is Crying - 3:36
 - 4:22
Equal Reason - 4:27

Underground Blue

Underground Blue (stylized UNDERGROUND BLUE) is Last Alliance's second studio album released on November 8, 2004. The track "Greens Sunlight" was featured in the Nippon TV program Ongaku Senshi: Music Fighter.

Track listing
South Wind Knows - 3:44
Clone - 4:12
 - 5:06
 - 4:06
One Hot Second - 3:45
 - 4:29
Urge - 3:34
Greens Sunlight - 3:46
 - 5:38
 - 3:41
 - 3:31
Truth in My Arms - 3:40
 - 6:10
Letter - 3:58

Me and Your Borderline

Me and Your Borderline is Last Alliance's third studio album released on December 6, 2006. The track "Spiral World" was used as the ending theme to the Nippon TV program Ongaku Senshi: Music Fighter and the tracks "Akai Hana" and "Jōka" were re-recorded on the limited edition release of Keep on Smashing Blue. The track "Shissou" was used as the ending theme to the anime "Ouran High-School Host Club".

Track listing
Break a mirror - 4:35
Konoyubitomare - 4:00
 - 3:54
 - 4:25
 - 4:22
 - 4:18
Spiral World - 3:40
 - 4:26
Gray End - 5:31
Fantasia - 4:21
Lie of Eternity, Paint It Blue - 4:32
 - 3:48
 - 3:57
 - 5:13

The Sum

The Sum (stylized the sum) is Last Alliance's fourth studio album released on June 25, 2008.

Track listing
Change by 1 - 3:05
Proud of Scar - 2:05
 - 4:18
 - 3:36
 - 3:20
Perfect Game - 4:30
- 4:48
 - 4:15
Drag On - 4:33
World Is Mine - 3:55
 - 4:47
 - 4:26

Keep on Smashing Blue

Keep on Smashing Blue (stylized Keep on smashing blue,) is Last Alliance's fifth studio album released on October 27, 2010. The Limited Edition release contains a DVD of the Kawasaki Relax tour held at Club Quattro on January 28, 2010, a PV of "Wing", and two bonus tracks previously featured in Me and Your Borderline: "Akai Hana (Sweet Anzai Boy)", performed by Anzai, and "Jōka (Angry Matsumura Boy)", performed by Matsumura.

Blue Lightning - 4:10
Everything Is Evanescent - 3:13
Ne(w)rotic World - 3:57
Loser - 1:17
 - 3:45
 - 2:13
Take Over - 1:32
Time Will Tell: Dear Youth - 3:03
Wing - 4:33
Alliance Airlines - 3:42
 - 3:41
 - 4:28
Hekireki - 3:45
Looking for the Rainy Sky - 3:03
 - 4:16
 (Limited Edition only) - 4:41
 (Limited Edition only) - 5:13

For Staying Real Blue

For Staying Real Blue (stylized for staying real BLUE.) is Last Alliance's sixth studio album released on June 15, 2011.

In My Hand - 2:23
Revolution Is Starting - 2:58
 - 3:29
 - 3:59
One - 3:52
 - 2:26
 - 3:57
Deandre - 3:34
 - 2:54
Redesign - 3:54
μ (Mu) - 3:24
Stardoubt - 3:06
 - 3:58
Precious Line - 3:03
 - 4:50
 (Limited Edition Bonus Track) - 3:18
Melancholy (Limited Edition Bonus Track) - 3:35

Seventh Sense

Seventh Sense (stylized Seventh Sense.) is Last Alliance's seventh studio album released on March 20, 2013.

BLUE BIRD SHERRY - 3:07
 - 4:24
 - 3:51
 - 4:36
a burning bullet - 4:14
 - 4:08
 - 5:09
DELETE - 4:52
 - 3:47
Sensation - 4:22
time-lag-cloud - 3:47
 - 5:31

Mini-albums

Kawasaki Relax

Kawasaki Relax (stylized KAWASAKI RELAX) is Last Alliance's first mini-album released on October 10, 2009. It is the first (and currently only) album that contains full English lyrics.

Track listing
Wedge - 3:27
Today - 3:27
Days - 2:58
8Heartbeat∞ - 3:08
Tomorrow - 3:41

Singles

Last Alliance

Last Alliance (stylized LAST ALLIANCE) is the first self-titled single by Last Alliance released on June 18, 2003. All three songs were later re-recorded in Tears Library. The single is currently out of print.

Track listing
Boys Don't Cry - 3:57
Last Alliance - 1:54
Equal REason - 4:27

YG Service

 is the second single by Last Alliance released on February 18, 2004. The CD for the single contains a music video for the song "Equal Reason".

Track listing
Sketch - 3:44
 - 4:20
Maboroshi Memory - 4:54

IO

IO is the third single by Last Alliance released on July 21, 2004. The songs "Solitude", "Musō Jidai", and "Truth in My Arms" were re-recorded in Underground Blue. The single is currently out of print.

Track listing
 - 5:09
 - 4:28
Melancholy - 3:35
Truth in My Arms - 3:38

Re:frain

Re:frain is the fourth single by Last Alliance released on October 5, 2005. The song "Konoyubitomare" was later re-recorded in Me and Your Borderline.

Track listing
Color Desert - 4:53
 - 4:41
Astrogate-0 - 4:38
Konoyubitomare - 4:32

Daze & Hope

Daze & Hope (stylized DAZE&HOPE) is the fifth single by Last Alliance released on May 17, 2006. The CD for the single contains a promotional video for the song "Greens Sunlight". The track "Shissō" was used as the ending theme for the anime television series Ouran High School Host Club and was later re-recorded in Me and Your Borderline.

Track listing
 - 3:55
Fly Again, Hero - 3:28
 - 0:25
One Drop of Tear - 3:32

Signal 004

Signal 004 is the sixth single by Last Alliance released on November 28, 2007. The song "Drag On" was rerecorded in the sum. A DVD of the single contains music videos of "Drag On" and "Shissō".

Track listing
Drag On - 4:39
 - 4:08
 - 4:29

Always in My Heart

Always in My Heart is the seventh single by Last Alliance released on April 16, 2008.  The track "Katahiza no Yogore" was used as the ending theme for the anime television series RD Sennō Chōsashitsu and was later re-recorded in the sum.

Track listing
 - 3:18
I.O.J.F.K (intro) - 1:07
I.O.J.F.K - 3:28

New Dawn

New Dawn (stylized new dawn) is the eighth single by Last Alliance released on March 4, 2009.  The track "Hekireki" was used the opening theme for the anime television series Hajime No Ippo: New Challenger and was later re-recorded in Keep on Smashing Blue.

Track listing
Hekireki - 4:09
My Idea - 3:46
- 4:25

External links
Official site
Hiroshi's blog

Japanese rock music groups
Japanese indie rock groups
Japanese alternative rock groups
Musical groups established in 2002
Musical groups from Tokyo
2002 establishments in Japan